Graphium monticolus, the Sulawesi blue triangle, is a butterfly of the family Papilionidae that is found in Sulawesi in Indonesia.

Taxonomy
Originally described as a subspecies of Papilio (Papilio sarpedon monticolus Fruhstorfer, 1896) later treated as a full species and placed in Graphium by most authorities (Graphium monticolus Fruhstorfer, 1896). Ranked again as a subspecies of Graphium sarpedon (Graphium sarpedon monticolus Fruhstorfer, 1896) by Tsukada and Nishiyama, 1982.

Subspecies
Graphium monticolus monticolus
Graphium monticolus textrix Tsukada & Nishiyaa, 1980

References
 
Tsukada, E. & Nishiyama, Y. 1982. Papilionidae. In: Tsukada, E. (ed): Butterflies of the South East Asian Islands. Volume 1. Plapac Co., Tokyo
Vane-Wright, R. I., & R. de. Jong. 2003. The butterflies of Sulawesi: annotated checklist for a critical island fauna. Zoologische Verhandlingen 343: 1-267 pdf Illustrated on Plate 5.

External links
External images

Butterflies described in 1896
monticolus
Butterflies of Indonesia
Taxa named by Hans Fruhstorfer